Fernbank is a small country town on the Perry River in Victoria, Australia, approximately 310 km east of Melbourne. With the main highway, Princes Highway close by, the small community not only services itself, but travellers along the main highway that stop for a break.

History 
The origin of the town's name is somewhat of a mystery. It is commonly believed that the town was named after the plants that grow by the banks of the Perry River, the fern, giving rise to the name, Fern-bank.

Fernbank Post Office opened on 1 January 1868 and closed in 1977.

Today
Approximately 2.5 km south-west of Fernbank is the Fernbank Landscape and Flora Reserve, just off of the main highway, Princes Highway.  There are some walking tracks and picnic spots.

Transport 

Fernbank used to be serviced by the Bairnsdale railway line, but the station closed to passengers in 1981 and then fully closed in 1996.  There is still a disused crossing loop and goods platform at the station.

References 

Towns in Victoria (Australia)
Shire of East Gippsland